Humour and the Misfortune of Others is the second studio album by New Zealand soul singer Hollie Smith. It was released on 15 March 2010.

Reception

Russell Baillie of The New Zealand Herald gave the album five stars, praising its "big angry and/or anguished anthems, clearly venting about her life and career's ups and downs".
Nick Ward of The Nelson Mail gave the album three-and-a-half stars, saying of it "Smith's voice has picked up a raspy edge that comes and goes, but she begins to loosen the restraints and show more melodic inventiveness".

Track listing
 "Mamma" – 4:06
 "Vs 19:19" – 4:54
 "Let Me Go" – 3:42
 "By My Side" – 4:48
 "Humour" – 4:44
 "Finding Home" – 5:03
 "Hiding" – 3:41
 "Overtime" – 6:42
 "Before This Day Is Done" – 5:11
 "Why Can't We Get Along" – 5:25
 "Brothers, Friends, Lovers" – 4:01
 "Will You Be the One?" – 4:26

Personnel
 Darren Mathiassen – drums
 Crete Haami – bass
 Tyson Smith – guitar
 Mark Vanilau - Keyboards, Grand Piano

Chart performance
Humour and the Misfortune of Others debuted at number one on the RIANZ New Zealand Albums Chart, the week of its release. It follows Smith's previous album, Long Player's number-one debut.

References

2010 albums
Hollie Smith albums